Al-Gawhara Palace ( Qaṣr al-Gawhara), also known as Bijou Palace, is a palace and museum in Cairo, Egypt. The palace is situated south of the Mosque of Muhammad Ali in the Cairo Citadel. It was commissioned by Muhammad Ali Pasha in 1814. 

The palace was designed and constructed by artisans contracted from a variety of countries, including Greeks, Turks, Bulgarians and Albanians. The artisans constructed a variety of elements as part of the palace complex: "barracks, schools, an arsenal, a gun-powder factory and a mint." The palace was constructed as a two-storey pavilion in the style of a Turkish kushk. It has Western style windows which were often topped with an oval oeil-de-boeuf. The French architect and engineer Pascal Coste was employed to add the residential quarters for the palace servants and functionaries. On one side of the palace was a haush (courtyard) and on the other, were views of the pyramids and the Nile.

In 1822, a fire destroyed the palace's wooden construction in a blaze that lasted for 2 days. Later, Muhammad Ali had the structure expanded and elaborated upon with the construction of "a large marble fountain, columned stone terraces and porticoes, parterres of flower beds and orange groves, and even a menagerie containing a lion, two tigers and an elephant, a gift of the British Lord Hastings."

Two years later, in 1824, fire again damaged the palace after explosions of gunpowder. Muhammad Ali imported large slabs of marble from Italy to build a vestibule, staircase and corridors.

In 1825, English traveller Anne Catherine Elwood described the opulence of the palace, and in particular its grand room that could "offer dancing, had deep niches for conversation, and side rooms for music, reading, games and refreshment."

Muhammad Ali's official divan or audience hall, where the pasha received guests, contains a 1000kg chandelier sent to him by Louis-Philippe I of France.
Some of the paintings in the Pasha hall of the palace portray the receiving of foreign ambassadors.

The palace also contains the throne of Muhammad Ali Pasha that was a gift from the King of Italy.

References

External links 
Kasr El-Gawhara or Jewel Palace

Museums in Cairo
Palaces in Cairo
History museums in Egypt
Historic house museums in Egypt